Tourism centers of Mersin Province, are eight officially determined locations where the touristic investments will be promoted through incentive scheme. in Mersin Province, Turkey.
Six of the locations are known as Tourist centers and the last two in Tarsus are known as Culture and Tourism conservation and development areas. Except for the last one (Karboğazı) which is in the mountains, all of these centers are seaside locations.

References 

Tourism in Mersin Province